M. ehrenbergii may refer to:

 Manta ehrenbergii, an eagle ray
 Morpheis ehrenbergii, a Mexican butterfly